The 2022 Oregon Ducks softball team represented the University of Oregon during the 2022 NCAA Division I softball season. The Ducks, led by 4th-year head coach Melyssa Lombardi, played their home games at Jane Sanders Stadium as members of the Pac-12 Conference.

Previous season 
Last season, the Ducks finished the season with a 14–10 record in conference play and a 40–17 overall record. They finished in third place in the Pac-12. In the postseason, the Ducks were invited and participated in the 2021 NCAA Division I softball tournament, where they lost to Texas State and the #12 national seed Texas in the Austin Regional in Austin, Texas.

Personnel

Roster

Coaches

Schedule

|-
! style=""| Regular Season: 8–1 (Home: 0–0; Away: 6–1; Neutral: 2–0)
|- valign="top" 
|

|- 
|

|- 
|

|- 
|

|}
Source:

Rankings

References

Oregon
Oregon Ducks softball
Oregon Ducks softball seasons
Oregon